Democratic Change is a centre-right political party in Panama.

The party was founded on May 20, 1998, by Ricardo Martinelli, owner of the Super 99 supermarket chain. At the end of 2013 the party listed more than 500,000 members, making it one of Panama's two largest parties with a membership almost equal to that of the Democratic Revolutionary Party.

In the legislative elections of May 3, 2009, the party won 23.4% of the popular vote and 14 out of 78 seats. In the presidential elections of the same year, the party leader, Ricardo Martinelli, was elected President of Panama with 59.97% of the vote.

The party's candidate for the presidential elections of 2014 was José Domingo Arias who led the opinion polls but lost to then vice-president Juan Carlos Varela of the Panameñista Party.

In January 2018, Rómulo Roux was elected as president of the party in place of Martinelli, who was detained in a federal prison in Miami at that time for corruption charges. Martinelli would later leave the party in 2020 after disputes over party leadership.

Platform

The party's populist platform includes the support for a strong welfare state, notably programs like Cien a los Setenta for those older than 70 years old and Beca Universal for schoolchildren, mixed with free-market capitalism (similar to a social market economy). This includes measures to attract tourism and business through tax incentives as well as infrastructure investments, such as the expansion of the Panama Canal, highways and airports.

External links
Official website
Electoral Court information page

References 

Political parties established in 1998
Political parties in Panama
Conservative parties in North America